The River Road Historic Rural District is a  historic district located on the western side of the Millstone River along a six-mile segment of River Road / County Route 533 in Hillsborough and Montgomery Townships, Somerset County, New Jersey. It is bounded on the north by Hillsborough Road and on the south by Van Horne Road / U.S. Route 206. The district was added to the National Register of Historic Places on March 21, 1991.

Contributing properties
The Laurence Van Derveer House was built in 1866 in an Italianate style.

The VanDerveer - Campbell House was built 1860–62 in the style of an Anglo-Norman Villa. Many of the farm buildings are also contributing.

The Garret Wyckoff House was built  in a Federal style with some Italianate elements.

The Rynear A. Staats House was built in the 1840s with Greek Revival elements.

Gallery

See also
 Millstone Valley Agricultural District – adjacent historic district on the north, along River Road

References

External links
 

Historic districts on the National Register of Historic Places in New Jersey
National Register of Historic Places in Somerset County, New Jersey
New Jersey Register of Historic Places
Colonial architecture in New Jersey
Federal architecture in New Jersey
Italianate architecture in New Jersey
Victorian architecture in New Jersey
Hillsborough Township, New Jersey
Montgomery Township, New Jersey